Centrope is an Interreg IIIA project to establish a multinational region in four Central European states: Slovakia, Austria, Hungary and the Czech Republic. The population of Centrope is 7,450,270.

Centrope is a joint initiative of the Austrian federal states of Vienna, Lower Austria and Burgenland, the Czech region of South Moravia, the Slovak regions of Bratislava and Trnava, and the Hungarian counties of Győr-Moson-Sopron and Vas. On the basis of the Kittsee Declaration of 2003, they work jointly towards the creation of the Central European Region in this four-country quadrangle.

See also
Economy of Europe

References

External links
Centrope Web
mycentrope.com
CEPIT
Telecast

Regional policies of the European Union
Politics of the European Union